Goblin Market and Other Poems is Christina Rossetti's first volume of poetry, published by Macmillan in 1862. It contains her famous poem "Goblin Market" and others such as "Up-hill", "The Convent Threshold", and "Maude Clare." It also includes the poem 'In the Round Tower at Jhansi, 8 June 1857', in which a British army officer takes his wife's life and his own so that they do not have to face a horrific and dishonourable death at the hands of the rebelling sepoys, commemorating the Jhokan Bagh massacre at Jhansi. Christina's brother, founding Pre-Raphaelite Brotherhood member Dante Gabriel Rossetti, designed the frontispiece and title page illustrations in the first edition, as well as the minimal blue binding. Christina was aware that her brother's "commercial savvy and artistic skill" helped make her first volume of poetry a success.

Footnotes

External links
In the Round Tower at Jhansi 8 June 1857 (text and discussion)
 

British poetry collections
Poetry by Christina Rossetti
1862 books